Chisquilla is one of 12 districts of the Bongará Province in the Amazonas region in Peru. Chisquilla, competitive, productive district, and, articulated to the national markets, with an agricultural sustainable diversity, promoter of an integral development, model of local management participativa and democratic; propitiating feeling of solidarity and cultural identification.

Administrative division
The populated places in the district are:
 Chisquilla
 Señoria
 Chilac
 Chirosh
 California
 Callejon
 Puerto el Milagro
 Shotaran
 Chinchango
 Puerto Arturo
 Tialango
 Conejo
 Galurco
 Payo
 yerba Buena
 Ganso Azul

Population
The population of Chisquilla is 352 people, 167 men and 185 women.

External links
Chisquilla district official website

References

1946 establishments in Peru
States and territories established in 1946
Districts of the Bongará Province
Districts of the Amazonas Region